Harold Ray Presley (October 5, 1948 in Tupelo, Mississippi – July 6, 2001) was the sheriff of Lee County, Mississippi, from 1993 to 2001.

Harold Ray Presley was one of six children born to Noah Edward Presley (1890-1969) and Mary Christine “Chris” Houston. He attended local schools, but dropped out of school in the tenth grade. In 1968 he was drafted into the Army and served in Vietnam in the Twenty-ninth General Support Group. After serving four years, he received an honorable discharge and returned to Tupelo.

Harold Presley was married, and had two sons and a daughter. Elvis Presley was his first cousin once removed.

Presley joined the sheriff's department in September 1987 as a narcotics officer. In 1993 he was elected sheriff of Lee County. During his tenure as sheriff, Presley received numerous awards including the Buford Pusser Award and the "Best of the Best Officers" for five years.

Perceiving a need for battling both the demand and supply of illegal drugs, Mr. Presley initiated the DARE Program in local schools to educate young people, several twelve-step programs in the jail to help recovering addicts, and a tough approach to law enforcement regarding illegal drug sales and use. After earning his own GED, he provided GED classes for training and testing inmates; he also started a work-center program for the inmates in his jail.

Presley was as famous for stopping the drug trade and drug traffic in Lee County, Mississippi, as Buford Pusser was for chasing down the State Line Mob and bootleggers in McNairy County, Tennessee, in the 1960s.

Presley died in the early morning hours of July 6, 2001, in a shootout with kidnapping suspect Billy Ray Stone (who kidnapped and killed Charlene Wright). The suspect had fled the scene of a roadblock and exchanged shots with pursuing officers. He managed to elude officers during a foot chase after crashing his vehicle. Later in the evening, Sheriff Presley received a call from Fellowship Road homeowner Robert Norris whose dogs were barking. Sheriff Harold Ray Presley, Deputy Jack Tate, and Norris entered a building behind the house where, during a gun battle, Presley pushed Deputy Tate clear of gunfire and was struck six times, mortally injured. He fired back at Stone, killing him with one shot. Wright died the following day from injuries she sustained after being ejected from her kidnapper's vehicle during the initial chase. 

In November of 2001, a special election was held to elect a sheriff to serve the remainder of Harold Ray Presley's term.  His brother and retired law enforcement officer, Larry Presley, was elected to serve his term. 

Harold Ray Presley was the uncle of New York Mets 1993 First Round Draft Pick, Kirk Presley.

Footnotes
NRLO Web Page
The Officer Down Memorial Page
New York Times
Blinkbits

References

1948 births
2001 deaths
American police officers killed in the line of duty
Deaths by firearm in Mississippi
Mississippi sheriffs
Politicians from Tupelo, Mississippi
20th-century American politicians
United States Army soldiers